Ram Madhvani is an Indian film director and producer known for his award-winning works in Hindi cinema, in the OTT space and in advertising. He is a-partner, director, and producer at Equinox Films, Ram Madhvani Films, and Equinox Virtual in partnership with Amita Madhvani. Ram is known for his National Award-winning Hindi feature film ‘Neerja’ starring Sonam Kapoor and Shabana Azmi. Under Ram Madhvani Films, Ram and Amita have created the International Emmy nominated series, Aarya starring Sushmita Sen. Its first season streamed on Disney+ Hotstar on 19 June 2020, Aarya Season 2 streamed on the 10th December 2021. Currently both seasons are streaming worldwide and are available via Hulu.

His Hindi feature film ‘Dhamaka’ starring Kartik Aaryan and Mrunal Thakur released on 19 November  2021 on Netflix as a global release and was listed amongst five action films to be streamed by The New York Times in Dec 2021.

Ram with Equinox Films has handcrafted some of India's most memorable ads for Adidas, Happydent White and Airtel’s Har Ek Friend & Jo Tera Hai Woh Mera Hai commercials, which have attracted universal praise.

Ram Madhvani's Equinox Films has three producers and six directors working with global clients. They are also associated with GreatGuns @EquinoxFilms.

In recognition of his contributions to advertising Ram was honoured with the Teachers Achievement Award (2004–2005).

 In 2006 he won a bronze and a silver lion at Cannes for the Happy Dent White commercial.

Career
Ram Madhvani is a respected filmmaker internationally for producing and directing feature films, web series, commercials, short films and music videos.

Advertisements 
In 2000, he won the Bronze Lion for Forte organ donation film and in 2007 he won the Silver Lion at the Cannes Lions International Festival of Creativity for the Happydent White commercial. This film also won Ram the Best Director, Best Film, and Best Production Design at the Asia Pacific Awards. Happydent has also been voted one of the Top 20 Commercials of the Millennium by the Gunn Report. It was the only Indian advertisement on the list. And Ram was ranked number 11 in the Most Awarded Directors by the Gunn Report. The Commercials for Happydent and LMN, directed by Ram, were amongst the Top 20 of the last twenty years in the Shots magazine.

In 2002, Madhvani released his directorial feature film debut ‘Let’s Talk’ with actors Boman Irani and Maia Katrak. It premiered at the Locarno Film festival and won him the Best Debut Director at the Srinivas Gollapudi National Awards.

In 2006 he won a bronze and a silver lion at Cannes for the Happy Dent White commercial. The film also won him Best Director, Best Film and Best Production Design at the Asia Pacific awards. Happy Dent has also been voted one of the Top 20 commercials of the millennium by the Gunn Report. The only Indian advertisement on that list, and was ranked number 11 in the most awarded Directors by the Gunn report.

In 2011, an advertisement he directed for Hippo Baked Munchies won a Silver for best Direction in the Film Craft awards at Adfest Bangkok. Ram was also President of the Jury for Film Craft at Adfest. Ram’s documentary, Everlasting Light, showcased Indian film star Amitabh Bachchan, at the Lincoln Center in New York. Richard Peña, director of the Lincoln Center, wrote: "It is rare that a film on an artist is itself a work of art."

In 2012, Ram was President of the Jury for Film Craft at Adfest Bangkok.

Ram has also won numerous awards at the Indian Advertising Festivals.

Feature Films & Short Formats
In 2002, Madhvani released his directorial debut feature film , ‘Let’s Talk’ with actors Boman Irani and Maia Katrak. It premiered at the Locarno Film Festival and won him the Best Debut Director at the Srinivas Gollapudi National Awards.

In 2007, Aamir Khan asked Ram to direct the "Bheja kum"  song for his film Taare Zameen Par.

In 2012, Ram was again approached by Aamir Khan to direct the official theme song video for his TV series Satyamev Jayate.

In February 2015, Ram set off on his next adventure with the aviation drama biographical film Neerja, starring Sonam Kapoor, Shabana Azmi, and Shekhar Ravjiani. The film was released on 19 February 2016 with critical appreciation and positive reviews. It was produced under the banner of Fox Star Studios and Bling Unplugged, with Amita Madhvani being the Associate Producer. The movie was a huge success both critically and commercially. Most reviewers gave the film 4 to 4.5 stars. Neerja has been one of the highest-grossing Indian films with a female lead in the Indian film history. For his work on Neerja, amongst many other awards, Ram won Best Director at the Star Screen Awards 2016, Stardust Awards 2017 and at the Zee Cine Awards 2017. He also won Critics Choice Best Film at the Filmfare Awards 2017. The film won the prestigious National Award for Best Hindi Feature Film in the same year.

In June 2020, Ram launched his own production house - Ram Madhvani Films while simultaneously entering the world of web series with Aarya, featuring Sushmita Sen. The first season of Aarya marked India on the global map by bagging an International Emmy nomination in 2021.

After the success of Aarya and Neerja, in November 2020, Ram Madhvani Films announced a remake of South Korean 2013 film The Terror Live titled as Dhamaka, co-produced with RSVP Movies, featuring Kartik Aaryan as the primary protagonist. The film, a dramatic thriller, released on 19 November 2021 on Netflix. The film opened to positive reviews and further enhanced Ram's status as a reputed filmmaker. Ram was the creator and a co- director for Aarya Season 2, which streamed on Disney+ Hotstar on 10 December 2021. The series was critically acclaimed and loved by OTT viewers all around the world and it was hailed as one of the most riveting family crime dramas in the digital space.

Short films 
Everlasting Light, a short documentary film directed by Ram Madhvani, which showcased Indian film superstar Amitabh Bachchan, premiered at the Lincoln Center in New York. Richard Peña, director of the Lincoln Center, wrote: "It is rare that a film on an artist is itself a work of art."

In March 2017, Ram released his short film ‘This Bloody Line’, based on the subject of the Partition. It was commissioned by ‘#BigShorts for India Tomorrow’ by India Today.

Filmography

References

External links
 
 Ram Madhvani profile on Kulzy 

Film directors from Mumbai
Indian advertising directors
Living people
Hindi-language film directors
21st-century Indian film directors
Year of birth missing (living people)
Screen Awards winners
Zee Cine Awards winners